Pilades is a genus of beetles in the family Carabidae, containing the following species:

 Pilades coquerelii (Fairmaire, 1868)
 Pilades ferus (Tschitscherine, 1894)
 Pilades sakalava (Alluaud, 1902)
 Pilades seyriganus W. Lorenz, 1998

References

Scaritinae